Alberta Provincial Highway No. 564 commonly referred to as Highway 564, is a highway in the province of Alberta, Canada. It runs mostly west-east from the east Calgary boundary (formerly at 84 Street NE, Range Road 290), through no town or village, through Wintering Hills, then north to Highway 569 south of the Red Deer River and Drumheller. It is known as Country Hills Boulevard in Calgary.

Major intersections 
Starting from the west end of Highway 564:

References 

Roads in Calgary
564